War Moans is the second studio album by American heavy metal band Mutoid Man, released on June 20, 2017 through Sargent House.

Track listing

Personnel

Mutoid Man
Stephen Brodsky - Lead vocals, guitar, additional engineering
Nick Cageao - Bass, backing vocals
Ben Koller - Drums, percussion

Additional musicians
Marty Friedman - lead guitar (track 8)
Chelsea Wolfe - vocals (tracks 9 & 12)
 Ben Chisholm - synthesizer (tracks 9 & 12), layout
Kurt Ballou - additional guitar (tracks 4 & 12)
Adam McGrath - extra guitar (track 7)

Production
 Kurt Ballou - Production, mixing
 Brad Boatright - Mastering
 Pat McCusker - Engineer
 Alex Garcia-Rivera - Drum technician
 Robert Cheeseman - Studio assistant
 Santos Illustraiton - Artwork
 Jason Zuocco - Photography
 Cathy Bellow - Manager

References

Mutoid Man albums
2017 albums